California's 7th State Senate district is one of 40 California State Senate districts. It is currently represented by Democrat Steve Glazer of Orinda.

District profile 
The district encompasses the East Bay east of the Berkeley Hills. It stretches from the western Sacramento–San Joaquin River Delta in the north down to the Tri-Valley region in the south. The district is suburban and primarily consists of bedroom communities of the San Francisco Bay Area.

Alameda County – 13.4%
 Dublin
 Livermore
 Pleasanton
 Sunol

Contra Costa County – 68.9%
 Alamo
 Antioch
 Bay Point
 Bethel Island
 Blackhawk
 Brentwood
 Camino Tassajara
 Clayton
 Concord
 Danville
 Diablo
 Discovery Bay
 Lafayette
 Moraga
 Oakley
 Orinda
 Pittsburg
 Saranap
 San Ramon
 Walnut Creek

Election results from statewide races

List of senators 
Due to redistricting, the 7th district has been moved around different parts of the state. The current iteration resulted from the 2011 redistricting by the California Citizens Redistricting Commission.

Election results 1992 - present

2020

2016

2015 (special)

2012

2008

2004

2000

1996

1992

See also 
 California State Senate
 California State Senate districts
 Districts in California

References

External links 
 District map from the California Citizens Redistricting Commission

07
Government of Alameda County, California
Government of Contra Costa County, California
Antioch, California
Brentwood, California
Concord, California
Danville, California
Diablo Range
Dublin, California
Lafayette, California
Amador Valley
Livermore Valley
Livermore, California
Orinda, California
Pittsburg, California
Pleasanton, California
San Ramon, California
Walnut Creek, California
Government in the San Francisco Bay Area